Beit Aghion (Aghion House), also known as Beit Rosh HaMemshala (lit. House of the Head of Government) or metonymously as Balfour is the official residence of the Prime Minister of Israel. It is located at 9 Smolenskin Street, on the corner of Balfour Street in the upscale central Jerusalem neighborhood of Rehavia.

History

The house was built between 1936 and 1938 for Greek-Jewish merchant Edward Aghion, an affluent resident of Alexandria in Egypt. It was designed by German architect Richard Kauffmann.

In 1941, Peter II, King of Yugoslavia resided in the house. During the 1948 Arab–Israeli War it served as a hospital for the Irgun fighters.

In 1952, the Israeli government purchased the house for the purpose of turning it to an official residence for the Foreign Minister. In 1974, the Israeli Government decided to transfer the official residence of the Prime Minister from Julius Jacobs House (com), which had served as the official residence of the Israeli Prime Minister between 1950 and 1974, to Beit Aghion. During the 1990s, a wall was erected around the house for security reasons and a segment of Balfour Street was closed to traffic.

Architecture
The building is composed of several square blocks connected to one another and in the center of the building there is a stairway, decorated with a row of windows in the front. The front of the building also includes a section molded in a circular way, and in a boat-like fashion typical of the International Style. The house is coated with Jerusalem stone. The premises include an inner courtyard (patio)—an element that differs from the common International Style, but is common among Islamic-style buildings. The patio was most probably added by request from the Aghion family.

Proposed residence relocation
On 8 February 2009, the Israeli government approved the Almog Project, which provides that the official residence of the Prime Minister be united with his office within the government complex, and out of Beit Aghion. The cost of that planned project was around 650 million shekels, and thus was criticized as overly extravagant. On 5 April, the decision to move the official residence of the Prime Minister of Israel was canceled.

In 2014, the plans to relocate the official residence to be close to the prime minister's office were approved by ministers.

See also
 Prime Minister of Israel
 Office of the Prime Minister (Israel)
 Beit HaNassi
 Ben Gurion House

References

Prime ministerial residences

Official residences in Israel
Buildings and structures in Jerusalem
1936 establishments in Mandatory Palestine
Houses completed in 1938
Rehavia